San Lorenzo Xochimanca (Xochimanca in Náhuatl, "place where flowers are offered") was a pre-Hispanic village and hacienda located in what is now the Colonia del Valle area of Mexico City.

San Lorenzo Chapel
The San Lorenzo Chapel, or Templo de San Lorenzo Xochimanca (also known as the Templo de San Lorenzo Mártir), was built in the 16th century and is still standing, built of brick and volcanic stone. Its bell tower was built in "Mixcoac" style with copper-colored bricks.

It was declared a National Monument of Mexico in the 1930s. At its base a cemetery operated until the early 20th century.

References

External links
Gabriela Salmorán Vargas, “San Lorenzo Xochimanca pueblo antiguo de la ciudad de México”, Tesis para la UNAM, Diciembre 2011

16th-century Roman Catholic church buildings in Mexico
National Monuments of Mexico
Neighborhoods in Mexico City
Roman Catholic churches in Mexico City
Spanish Colonial architecture in Mexico